8 Foot Sativa is a New Zealand-based extreme metal band formed in 1998. Their most famous single is their self-titled song, "8 Foot Sativa", which was number one on the M2 (a late night New Zealand music show) top 12 list for 12 weeks, and stayed on the chart for seven months. The band has toured and released albums internationally, and have played alongside artists such as Fear Factory, Soulfly, Korn, Slipknot, System of a Down, Children of Bodom, Disturbed, Motörhead, Pungent Stench, Shihad and Corrosion of Conformity. 8 Foot Sativa have become a household name in New Zealand.

History

Early days (1998–2002)
8 Foot Sativa formed when members Brent Fox and Gary Smith met at Massey High School in Auckland, New Zealand. They both enjoyed metal music and played music together. Peter 'Speed' Young from Kelston Boys' High School joined the band as the band's drummer. 'Fat' Dave was on the bass guitar. In their early days, they were a cover band, who played music from Pantera, Iron Maiden, Judas Priest, Sepultura, Metallica and Slayer.

'Fat' Dave often did not turn up to practices, so Brent Fox moved from guitar to bass. The band met their next vocalist, Ari, at a music school, where he was formally training as a drummer. Ari was the first vocalist to write original songs for the band, and wrote "Fuel Set", "Kick It All Away" and "Engine", which later appeared on the band's debut album.

During this time, the band met Justin 'Jackhammer' Niessen at a mall. According to Gary Smith: "He used to sneak into the gigs and we'd sneak him beers". After Ari's disappearance from the band (the other members didn't see him for several years), Niessen became the new vocalist.

Niessen is famous among 8 Foot Sativa fans for occasionally collapsing on-stage due to the strain of his vocal performances, most notably during a performance of "Destined to be Dead" on a New Zealand music show, Space. NZMusician.com claims that these collapses were due to, "shortage of breath attributed to a lack of vocal training".

Hate Made Me (2002)
In 2002, 8 Foot Sativa released their debut album, Hate Made Me, with the album later receiving gold status within New Zealand for selling more than 7,500 copies Shortly after the release of Hate Made Me, Young left the band, reportedly citing 'musical differences'. He was replaced with Sinate drummer, Sam Sheppard.

This album features what is probably 8 Foot Sativa's most well-known song, the eponymous "8 Foot Sativa", which is a staple of their live shows. It also appeared in an episode of Monster Garage.

Season For Assault (2003)
In 2003, 8 Foot Sativa released their second album Season for Assault, which neared gold status within New Zealand. The album features well- known songs "Chelsea Smile" and "Season For Assault".

Niessen resigned from the band two weeks before they were set to fly to Sweden to record their third album. The singer position was vacant for two days before Sam Sheppard's brother (and fellow Sinate member), Matt Sheppard, became 8 Foot Sativa's new vocalist.

Breed The Pain (2005)
With a new vocalist, 8 Foot Sativa released their third album Breed the Pain in 2005. It was recorded at Studio Underground in Sweden. Matt Sheppard wrote or co-wrote six of the songs on the album, and his girlfriend provided the artwork.

Matt and Sam Sheppard left 8 Foot Sativa after the Breed the Pain tour. They later reformed their previous band, Sinate. They joined forces with 8 Foot Sativa's guitar technician Sean Parkinson and Antony "Colonel" Folwell from the band Reprobate.

Justin 'Jackhammer' Niessen toured with the band temporarily from 9 September until 17 September, playing a four concert tour around New Zealand. This tour also saw newcomers William Cleverdon and Corey Friedlander, joining the band. For the concert tour, Niessen and the band played songs mainly from Hate Made Me and Season for Assault, the albums which Niessen performed on.

Poison of Ages (2007)
Ben Read, from New Zealand death metal band Ulcerate and formerly of hardcore band Kill Me Quickly, joined the band as the new vocalist. 8 Foot Sativa went over to Studio Underground in Sweden again to record their fourth album, titled Poison of Ages. Corey Friedlander did not perform drums on the album and would later leave the band to focus on his other project Final Eve. Steven Westerberg of Carnal Forge stepped in as a session musician, and Friedlander was ultimately replaced by Jamie Saint Merat, also of Ulcerate.

Poison of Ages was originally meant to be released on 8 May 2006, however it was postponed due to a breached contract. Ben Read stated on the official forum's that the album would not be released until the band could put together NZ$20,000. The album was finally released on 21 May 2007.

Several members of the band departed in the meantime: In October 2006, original member Brent Fox decided to leave the band, leaving Gary Smith as the only original member. Fox was replaced by Rommily Smith. Guitarist William Cleverdon, who had earlier taken a hiatus of several months, was forced to leave in January 2007 after he was required to undergo a series of surgeries on his left wrist and forearm. Christian Humphreys, a member of Rommily's other band, New Way Home, replaced Cleverdon

Lyrics on Poison of Ages were written by Ben Read and Gary Smith, and the album as a whole was influenced by blackened death metal.

2009

Gary Smith returned from injury to rejoin the band. Jamie Saint Merat left the band to relocate with his other band, Ulcerate.

8 Foot Sativa, still working on a new unnamed album, released a new single called Sleepwalkers. The video to this single is controversial, as it follows a calf from the farm, to the freezing works showing it being killed, then chopped up by butchers, before being sold to a family in a supermarket. It does this in graphical disturbing way. It also shows pigs and chickens being held in cages. A message at the end of the video states "Thousands of animals were harmed in the making of this video."

In July 2009, bassist Romilly Smith left the band, with Steve Boag, of In Dread Response, taking his spot. Before heading to the studio to record the new still unnamed album, 8 Foot Sativa are to travel New Zealand, performing final shows, with In Dread Response, New Way Home, Bloodletting, The Rest Is Silence.., and other various local acts across New Zealand

2010
In January 2010, 8 Foot Sativa went into hiatus due to the continued effects of Smith's injury. The remaining members formed a new band project, The Mark of Man, while Smith continued his recovery.

2011

After a couple of years on hiatus, the social media connected fan base started talking and rumours began when the band's Facebook page was completely stripped back and saturated by their original theme and imagery including the one and only "dopeman" the band's featured character and mascot which became the band's non-forgettable logo and animated menace seen in their early music videos, a tall and cheeky Sativa plant usually pulling himself in and around war zones and heated political situations with his large leafy arms.

With the return of Justin "Jackhammer" Niessen and the addition of Nik Davies from Death Metal act "Perditionist" the band released a greatest hits compilation entitled "10 Years of Sativa" in 2012. This campaign saw the band touring relentlessly right up until the recording and release of what soon was to become "The Shadow Masters"

The Shadow Masters (2013)
8 Foot Sativa entered Quicksand Studio in Christchurch, New Zealand in early 2013 to record their 5th studio album 'The Shadow Masters'.
The line up for this album is:

Vocals – Justin "Jackhammer" Niessen
Drums – Corey Friedlander
Guitar – Gary Smith
Guitar – Nik Davies
Bass – Brent Fox

8 Foot Sativa have Clint Murphy from Modern World Studio in the UK producing this album. The Shadow Masters was released on 30 August 2013.

Hate Re-Made Me  (2015)
The line up consisted of the three original members plus Nik Davies and Corey Friedlander.

With Clint Murphy back on board, the less than $1000 produced HMM record got a complete re-amp as the band dropped 40k into studio time for a re-recording.

A recent interview with Nik Davies brought light upon the situation where he simply stated that "its there, we are proud of it and it will be released when we feel it's right to do so. 8 Foot Sativa will always exist, we're not going anywhere"

Band personnel

Current
 Justin "Jackhammer" Niessen – vocals (2002–2003, 2005, 2011–present)
 Corey Friedlander – drums (2005–2006, 2009–present)
 Nik Davies – guitars (2011–present)
 Paul Jason Lawrence – Bass (2017–present)
 Gary Smith - Guitars (1999–present)

Former
 Peter "Speed" Young – drums (1998–2001)
 Sam Sheppard – drums (2001–2004)
 Matt Sheppard – vocals (2003–2004)
 Brent Fox – bass (1998–2006, 2012–2014, 2014–2015)
 Ben Read – vocals (2006–2009)

Discography

Studio albums
 Hate Made Me (2002)
 Season for Assault (2003)
 Breed the Pain (2005)
 Poison of Ages (2007)
 Ten Years of Sativa (2012) 
 The Shadow Masters (2013)

Tracks on various compilations

References

External links
 
 8 Foot Sativa's Myspace profile
 
 8 Foot Sativa MusicMight biography

New Zealand death metal musical groups
Thrash metal musical groups
Musical groups established in 1998
1998 establishments in New Zealand
Musical groups from Auckland
Black Mark Production artists